Just Visiting is a compilation album by Australian progressive rock band Cog, released on 16 August 2008. The album is a compilation – re-release of the 2002 EPs Just Visiting Part One and Just Visiting Part Two as a full album – using the combined track listing but with the original long versions of "Bondi" and "Moshiach". In April 2003 both parts appeared on the ARIA Heavy Rock & Metal Singles Chart, with Part One peaking at No. 14 and Part Two reaching No. 4. Lucius Borich remastered the album at Studios 301.

Track listing

All songs written, composed and performed by Cog.

Personnel 

Cog
Flynn Gower – lead vocals, guitar
Lucius Borich – drums, vocals, samples
Luke Gower – bass guitar, vocals

References

Just Visiting
Just Visiting